Meghji Pethraj Shah (15 September 1905 in Dabsang Jamnagar – 30 July 1964) was a Gujarati Jain businessman. He was member of Rajya Sabha from Bombay State for the term 3 April 1956 to 2 April 1962 but resigned on 26 July 1957.

In Saurashtra, development of libraries owes its origin to Meghaji Pethraj Shah, who made a munificent donation of one crore of rupees. As a result, 150 libraries were started in each district of Saurashtra.

One primary government school was built on his name. M.P. Shah Primary School Nagadia, Kalyanpur, Jamnagar.

References 

Gujarati people
1905 births
1964 deaths
Shah Meghji
20th-century Indian politicians
People from Jamnagar district